Dichagyris eremicola is a moth of the family Noctuidae. It is found in southern and eastern Russia, the southern Urals, Turkey, Turkestan, central Asia and the Altai mountains.

External links
Fauna Europaea

eremicola
Moths of Asia
Moths described in 1888